Associated Hebrew Schools of Toronto is a private traditional Jewish day school with campuses in Toronto, Ontario. Its three branches are: Kamin Elementary School at the Hurwich Education Centre (252 Finch Ave. W), the Posluns Education Centre (18 Neptune Drive), and Danilack Middle School at the Hurwich Education Centre (252 Finch Ave. W). Founded in 1907, it was incorporated as a not-for-profit organization in 1922.

History 
In 1907, the Simcoe Street Talmud Torah was founded as a part of the Toronto Hebrew Religious School, run by Rabbi Jacob Gordon. The school was renamed to Associated Hebrew Schools of Toronto in 1910.

In 1941, Associated opened a preschool known as Bet Hayeled and in 1943, its first day school Grade 1 class. AHS opened the Neptune campus (since 1998 known as the Posluns Education Centre) in 1952, the Hurwich Education Centre in 1972, the Danilack Middle School on Leslie in 1982, and the Kamin Education Centre in 1995.

In 2003 the Hurwich Education Centre was rebuilt and merged with the Danilack Middle School.

Campuses

Danilack Middle School at the Hurwich Education Centre 
The Hurwich Education Centre was originally built in September 1971. It was originally an Elementary School.  It is named after Nathan O. and Roey Hurwich. Later they renovated and named the inside of the building to the Danilack Middle School, named after Abba and Esther Danilack. The principal is Faye Rewald and the Vice Principal is Debbie Cohen-Savage.

Kamin Elementary School at the Hurwich Education Centre 
The Kamin Education Centre, named after Jack and Bushie Kamin, was built in 1995. It is an elementary school. Currently, the principal is Kevin Knopman. In September 2019, the Kamin Elementary Centre moved to join Danilack Middle School at the Hurwich Education Centre.

Posluns Education Centre 
The Posluns Education Centre is a Nursery and Elementary School. It is named after Louis and Leah Posluns. The principal is Dr. Lee-Ron Kaye.

References

External links 

 Associated Hebrew Schools web site

Educational institutions established in 1907
Elementary schools in Toronto
Middle schools in Toronto
Private schools in Toronto
Jewish Canadian history
Jewish day schools
Elementary schools in the Regional Municipality of York
Jewish schools in Canada
Jews and Judaism in Ontario
1907 establishments in Ontario